42-line battery field gun M1877 was a field gun used by the Russian Imperial Army in late 19th and early 20th centuries. The word "line" in the designation refers to a measurement unit which equals 0.1 inch.

History
The 42-line field gun M1877 was designed by Krupp. Some of the guns were manufactured in Germany while most of them were manufactured in the Obuhov factory in Russia. Use of the guns were limited by lack of equipment needed for indirect fire - the Russian gun-sight used with them was suitable only to direct fire. Therefore, the gun saw use as fortress and coastal artillery for coastal defence which allowed the guns to shoot direct fire for defending harbours and beaches.

In 1918 the Finnish Army could capture some 102 42-line field guns and put them into service. Last shots being fired with the field gun were during the Winter War in March 1940.

The 42-line field gun M1877 could fire high explosive (HE) or shrapnel shells of 12.5 kg (27.6 lbs) weight at a distance of 5.3 km (3.3 miles).

The 42-line field gun M1877 should not be confused with the 42-line siege gun M1877, a siege gun version which had a longer barrel and higher muzzle velocity.

Literature
Shirokorad A. B. - Encyclopedia of the Soviet Artillery - Mn. Harvest, 2000 (Широкорад А. Б. Энциклопедия отечественной артиллерии. — Мн.: Харвест, 2000.)

External links

JAEGER PLATOON: FINNISH ARMY 1918 - 1945 WEBSITE. ARTILLERY PART 1: Russian guns without recoil system

References

107 mm artillery
World War I artillery of Russia
Russo-Japanese war weapons of Russia